The Palestine national futsal team is controlled by the Palestinian Football Association, the governing body for futsal in Palestine and represents the country in international futsal competitions.

Tournaments

FIFA Futsal World Cup
FIFA Futsal World Cup
 1989 – Did not enter
 1992 – Did not enter
 1996 – Did not enter
 2000 – Did not enter
 2004 – Did not enter
 2008 – Did not enter
 2012 – Did not qualify
 2016 – Did not enter
 2020 – Did not qualify

AFC Futsal Asian Cup

WAFF Futsal Championship
WAFF Futsal Championship
 2007 – Did not enter
 2009 – Did not enter
 2012 – Fifth place
 2022 – Group stage

Arab Futsal Cup
Arab Futsal Cup
 1998 – 4th Place
 2005 – Withdrew
 2007 – Did not enter
 2008 – Withdrew
 2021 – Did not enter

Recent results

References

Asian national futsal teams
F